Indian Army operations in Jammu and Kashmir include security operations such as Operation Rakshak, which began in 1990, Operation Sarp Vinash in 2003 and Operation Randori Behak in 2020. Other operations include humanitarian missions such as Operation Megh Rahat and operations with a social aim such as Operation Goodwill and Operation Calm Down. The Indian Army works in tandem with the other arms of the Indian Armed Forces and security forces in Jammu and Kashmir such as during Mission Sahayata or joint operations.

Security Impact

Operation Rakshak 
Operation Rakshak is an ongoing counter-insurgency and counter-terrorism operation started during the height of insurgency in Jammu and Kashmir in June 1990. The operation adapted itself from being merely a "show of strength" in 1990 to encompassing more areas in 1991 such as orders "not to enter the houses of civilians", "not to smoke in religious places" and "not to damage standing crops". 753 Indian army personnel died during Operation Rakshak between 2007 and 2015.

Major Mohit Sharma, who was killed while performing duties under Operation Rakshak, was posthumously awarded India's highest peacetime gallantry award ‘Ashok Chakra’ on 15 August 2009. Corporal Jyoti Prakash Nirala was also killed during Operation Rakshak 18 November 2017, and was posthumously awarded the Ashok Chakra on 25 January 2018. The Operation Rakshak Memorial is located in Badami Bagh Cantonment, Srinagar.

Operation All Out 

Operation All Out (OAO) a joint offensive launched by Indian security forces in 2017 to flush out militants and terrorists in Kashmir until there is complete peace in the state. Operation All-Out includes the Indian Army, CRPF, Jammu and Kashmir Police, BSF and IB. It was launched against numerous militant groups including Lashkar-e-Taiba, Jaish-e-Mohammed, Hizbul Mujahideen and Al-Badr.

The operation was initiated with the consent of Ministry for Home Affairs Government of India following the unrest in 2016 due to the death of Burhan Wani and subsequent militant and terrorist attacks in the region such as the Amarnath Yatra terror attack on 10 July 2017 in which eight Hindu pilgrims were killed and at least 18 others injured.

On 14 January 2019, the Jammu and Kashmir Governor, Satya Pal Malik, said that there was no such thing as Operation All Out and that the phrase was a misnomer:

Operation Calm Down 
Operation Calm Down was started by the Indian army in Jammu and Kashmir following the aftermath of the death of Burhan Wani in July 2016 which had led to unrest in Kashmir in which more than 90 civilians and 2 security personnel were killed and thousands injured. It was started in September 2016. Over 4000 additional troops were deployed as part of Operation Calm Down to bring back order to the region, but direct instructions were given to the troops to use minimal force. The troops were mainly deployed in South Kashmir. Schools, shops and connectivity to some regions in Kashmir had been lost for over three months due to the unrest and militancy and Operation Calm Down aimed to undo this.

Operation Sarp Vinash 
Operation Sarp Vinash (Snake Destroyer) was an operation undertaken by Indian army to flush out terrorists who made bases in the Hilkaka Poonch-Surankot area of the Pir Panjal range in Jammu and Kashmir during April–May 2003. 64 terrorists belonging to various jihadist outfits were killed in operation. The system of hideouts used by the terrorists found during this operation was the largest ever in the known history of insurgency in Jammu and Kashmir.

Over several years, terrorists of groups like Lashkar-e-Taiba (LeT), Harkat-ul-Jihad-e-Islami, al-Badr and Jaish-e-Mohammad (JeM) had been building up safe houses and bunkers in strategic areas of the region of Pir Panjal in Poonch measuring 150 sq kilometers.

The network of bunkers and shelters around the region known as Hill Kaka in Surankote numbered nearly over a hundred, and were intermingled with shelters used by local herdsmen. 9 Para-SF were called to capture Peak 3689 in Hill Kaka after surveillance picked up footprints converging at one location. In this operation, 13 terrorists were killed, the single largest number during Op. Sarp Vinash. 6 Rashtriya Rifles, 163th Brigade, 100th Brigade and the 15th Corps were also called in for operations. From diaries captured from killed terrorists, the presence of a rudimentary counter-intelligence system of the terrorist organisations was revealed, which involved killing women and children who had given up information to Indian security forces. An extensive communications system using portable satellite phones was also found which allowed the terrorists to contact handlers in Pakistan and India. Paratrooper Sanjog Chhetri, 9 Para (SF), was awarded an Ashoka Chakra in 2004 posthumously for his role in the Operation Sarp Vinash in which he succumbed. During Operation Sarp Vinash, media claims of different Indian media houses about what actually happened during the operation were hyped and very contradictory.

Operation Sadbhavana (Goodwill) 
Operation Sadbhavana, also referred to as Operation Goodwill, was launched in Jammu and Kashmir by the Indian Army under their Military Civic Action programmes aimed at "Winning the Hearts and Minds" (WHAM) of the people in the region. Sadbhavna literally means 'harmony', therefore the operation can also be translated as Operation Harmony. The catchphrase of the operation is "Jawan aur Awam, Aman Hai Muqaam" (peace is the destination for both the people and the soldier).

Welfare initiatives under Operation Sadbhavana include infrastructure development, medical care, women and youth empowerment, educational tours and sports tournaments among other initiatives. Over 450 crore rupees (70 million US$) has been directly spent on this programme and more funding provided through donors. The projects are planned according to the needs and desires of the local population and are handed over to the state government after successful initiation. 'Operation Sadbhavana' is a resolve by the Indian army to come closer to the population in Jammu and Kashmir and develop mutual faith and trust which the army gets across the rest of India.

Background 
Operation Sadbhavana was officially launched in 1998, especially in rural areas near the Line of Control (LOC) where insurgency and militancy had caused destruction to property and a sense of alienation among the people of Jammu and Kashmir from the rest of India.

Initiatives 
Kashmir Super-30 & Super-40

In 2013, the Indian Army teamed up with the New Delhi-based NGO, Centre for Social Responsibility and Leadership (CSRL), to launch the Super-30 initiative along the lines of the highly acclaimed and successful Super-30 concept started by Abhayanand in Bihar. Over time the initiative included more students and was subsequently called the Army Super-40, and soon will become the Army Super-50. Nine students of the 2016-17 Army Super-40 batch cleared the difficult IIT-JEE advanced examination. Various Indian organizations have provided funding for this project including Power Grid India contributing for the first batch, the Rural Electrification Council (REC) contributing for the second batch and the TATA Relief Committee funding the third batch.

Schools

The Indian Army has established 53 English medium Army Goodwill Schools in places in Jammu and Kashmir such as Rajouri, Poonch, Boniyar, Uri (Baramulla), Khanabal (Anantnag), Karu (Leh), Kargil and Chandigam (Kupwara). Assistance has also been provided to approximately 2700 public schools. These army schools are known to provide undisturbed and good quality education even during times of unrest. Army Goodwill Schools operating under the shelter of Operation Sadbhavana are educating more than 10,000 students in the Kashmir Valley itself and over 14,000 students in Jammu and Kashmir.

Women Empowerment Centres

Here women are taught various skills, awareness is raised about health and birth control, information regarding banking and loan procedures is imparted, basic education is imparted including operating computers, fashion designing and craft related skills. Under this initiative centers such as the Women's Vocational Training Centre, Poonch, Usha Fashion Design School, Baramulla and Women Empowerment Centre, Baramulla have been set up.
Educational/Motivational Tours

Between 2012 and 2015, the Indian army conducted over 250 educational, national integration and capacity building tours (CBTs) and in each tour around 30 members are accommodated. The members of the tour get to visit places such as Punjab, Dehradun, Kerala, Kolkata, Bhubaneswar, Gopalpur, Agra and New Delhi which each tour being unique in its own way. The students also get to interact with students in India, administrative and government officials, which sometimes also includes the President and Prime Minister of India, as well as other figures. For many of the Kashmiri children on tours, they get the opportunity for the first time to travel outside Kashmir.

Model Villages

Model Villages set up under Operation Sadbhavana include Chandigam Model Village, Lolab (Kupwara) and Sagra Model Village, Mendhar (Poonch).

Health Care

Medical Camps are conducted on a regular basis by the Indian army. A Military Hospital in Kargil has also been set up which also caters to civilians with various services being free of cost. The Pritam Spiritual Foundation (Poonch) under Operation Sadbhavana has provided artificial limbs free of cost to over 3100 people who have been victims of militancy, mine blasts or crossborder firing. Under operation Sadbhavana veterinary aid camps and free treatment to civil animals are also offered.

Sports

The Indian army organises various sporting events in Jammu and Kashmir in coordination with local sports bodies. Some events that has been conducted under this initiative includes the Kashmir Premier League, Baramulla Girls Badminton League, Baramulla Cricket Premier League, Kupwara Premier Football League, Gingle Volleyball League. As many thirty two teams participated in the cricket tournament even as sixteen teams participated in the football tournament.

Operation Megh Rahat 

In September 2014, Jammu and Kashmir witnessed severe flooding in many areas. The rainfall and flooding resulted in people dying on both sides of the border. The Indian Armed Forces were deployed to conduct search, rescue, relief (NDRF and other local bodies also coordinated efforts). Nearly 30,000 troops were deployed. By mid-September, over 200,000 people were rescued by the Armed forces. While the Army's Northern Command response was called Operation Megh Rahat, the Armed Forces assistance as a whole was called Mission Sahayata.

Militant fatalities since 1990
Encounters generally increase in the summer season when the snow melts on the high Himalayan peaks dividing Indian- and Pakistani-administered Kashmir, making it easier for trained militants to cross over into the Indian side. The Indian Army changes its strategy in summer which included redeployment as per summer infiltration routes along the LoC.

Timeline

Summary

2017 
A total of 213 militants were killed under the operation by the Indian security forces in 2017. The security forces were able to persuade 82 youth to abandon militancy and come back. 78 security personnel were also killed in militant related violence.

January
 On 2 January, one militant was killed in the Tarzoo area of Haritar village in Sopore, Baramulla district.
 On 6 January, one Al-Badr militant, Muzzafar Ahmed, was killed in Machu area of Budgam district.
 On 10 January, one militant was killed in Hajin area of Bandipora district.
 On 11 January, two militants were killed during an infiltration bid in Betar Nala of Poonch Sector.
 On 15 January, three militants were killed in Pahalgam area of Anantnag district.
 On 18 January, one militant was killed in Hajin village of Bandipora district.
 On 24 January, two militants were killed in Hadoora area of Ganderbal district. Another militant was killed during an infiltration bid Sunderbani sector of Rajouri district.

February

 On 4 February, two militants were killed in Amargarh area of Baramulla district.
 On 11 February, four Hizbul Mujahideen and Lashkar-e-Taiba militants and two Indian Army soldiers were killed in Frisal village of Kulgam district.
 On 13 February, one militant and three Indian Army soldiers were killed in Hajin area of Bandipora district.
 On 14 February, three militants and an Indian Army major were killed in Hajan, Handwara district.
 On 22 February, three Indian Army soldiers of 44 Rashtriya Rifles unit were killed in an attack on army convoy by Hizbul Mujahideen militants in Shopian district.

March

 On 4 March, two Hizbul Mujahideen militants and a police constable were killed in Tral village of Pulwama district.
 On 9 March, two Lashkar-e-Taiba militants and a civilian were killed in Padgampora village of Pulwama district. Another Hizbul Mujahideen militant was killed near a police station in Bandipora district.
 On 15 March, three militants and a civilian were killed in Jugtiyal village of Kupwara district.
 On 22 March, one militant and three civilians were killed in Chadoora area of Budgam district.

April

 On 9 April, four militants were killed during an infiltration bid in Keran sector of Kupwara district.
 On 22 April, two Lashkar-e-Taiba militants were killed in Hayatpora village of Chadoora, Budgam district.
 On 26 April, two militants and three Indian Army soldiers were killed in an attack on an Indian Army garrison in Chowkibal's Panzgam area, Kupwara district.

May

 On 14 May, two Lashkar-e-Taiba militants were killed in Waripora village of Handwara, Kupwara district.
 On 20 May, two militants and two Indian Army soldiers were killed during an infiltration bid in Naugam sector of Kupwara district.
 On 26 May, six militants were killed during an infiltration bid in Rampur sector. Two Hizbul Mujahideen militants were killed in Saimuh near Hardumir, Tral, Pulwama district. Also, two militants of BAT were killed in Uri sector of Baramulla district.
 On 31 May, two militants were killed in Nathipora village of Sopore, Baramulla district.

June

 On 7 June, three militants and one Indian Army soldier were killed during an infiltration bid in Naugam sector of Kupwara district.
 On 9 June, five militants were killed during an infiltration bid in Uri sector of Baramulla district.
 On 10 June, one militant was killed during an infiltration bid in Gurez sector of Bandipora district.
 On 16 June, three Lashkar-e-Taiba militants, including Junaid Mattoo, were killed in Arwani village of Bijbihara, Anantnag District.
 On 20 June, two Hizbul Mujahideen militants were killed in Pazalpora village of Sopore, Baramulla district.
 On 21 June, three Lashkar-e-Taiba militants were killed in Kakapora area of Pulwama district.
 On 22 June, two militants were killed during an infiltration bid in Keran sector of Kupwara district.
 On 25 June, two Lashkar-e-Taiba militants were killed in Delhi Public School (DPS) complex in Srinagar.

July

 On 1 July, two Lashkar-e-Taiba militants and two civilians were killed in Brenti village of Anantnag district.
 On 3 July, three militants were killed in Bamnoo area of Pulwama district.
 On 9 July, three militants were killed during an infiltration bid in Naugam sector of Kupwara district.
 On 11 July, three Hizbul Mujahideen militants were killed in Radbugh village, Magam area of Budgam district.
 On 15 July, three militants were killed in Satora area of Tral.
 On 17 July, two militants were killed during an infiltration bid in Gurez sector of Bandipora district. Three Lashkar-e-Taiba militants involved in the 2017 Amarnath Yatra attack were also killed in Wanihama of Anantnag district.
 On 22 July, a militant was killed during an infiltration bid in Machil sector of Kupwara district.
 On 26 July, three militants were killed during an infiltration bid in Gurez sector of Bandipora district.
 On 29 July, two militants were killed in Tahab area of Pulwama district.
 On 31 July, a militant was killed in an infiltration bid in Rampur sector and another militant was killed in Turna village of Uri sector, Baramulla district.

August

 On 1 August, two Lashkar-e-Taiba militants, including Abu Dujana, and a civilian were killed in Hakripora village of Pulwama district.
 On 2 August, two militants were killed in Gopalpora area of Kulgam district.
 On 3 August, one Hizbul Mujahideen militant was killed at Kanibal in Bijbehara of Anantnag district.
 On 4 August, three Lashkar-e-Taiba militants were killed in Amargarh area of Sopore district.
 On 6 August, a Lashkar-e-Taiba militant was killed in Samboora area of Pulwama district.
 On 7 August, five militants were killed during an n infiltration bid in Machil sector of Kupwara district.
 On 9 August, three Ansar Ghazwat-ul-Hind militants were killed in Gulab Bagh area of Tral, Pulwama district.
 On 12 August, three Hizbul Mujahideen militants including, Yaseen Itoo, and two Indian Army soldiers were killed in Awneera village of Shopian district.
 On 16 August, a Lashkar-e-Taiba district commander was killed in Pulwama district.
 On 22 August, a militant was killed in Haphruda forest area of Handwara, Kupwara district.
 On 26 August, three militants, four CRPF personnel and four J&K policemen were killed in an attack on a CRPF camp in Pulwama district.

September

 On 1 September, one Lashkar-e-Taiba militant was killed in Tantray Pora of Kulgam district. The militant was suspected to be involved in the killing of Lt Ummer Fayaz.
 On 4 September, two Lashkar-e-Taiba militants were killed in Shanker Gund Brath area of Sopore district.
 On 9 September, one Hizbul Mujahideen militant was killed in Reban village of Sopore district.
 On 10 September, two Hizbul Mujahideen militants were killed in Khudwani area of Kulgam district. Two more Hizbul Mujahideen militants were killed and one surrendered in Barbugh area of Shopian district.
 On 14 September, two Lashkar-e-Taiba militants were killed in Aribagh area of Nowgam. One of the militant killed was Abu Ismail who was responsible for the 2017 Amarnath Yatra attack Another Hizbul Mujahideen militant was arrested from Bandipora district.
 2 militants were killed in an infiltration bid in Machil sector of Kupwara district on 15 September.
 On 25 September, four militants were killed at Kalgai village in Uri sector. Another militant was killed in the Zorawar area of Uri district.

October

 Four Jaish-e-Mohammed militants and one BSF soldier were killed in an attack on a 182nd battalion (BSF) camp near Srinagar airport on 1 October.
 On 2 October, two militants were killed in an infiltration bid in Rampur sector, Baramulla district and three militant were killed in another bid in Tangdhar sector, Kupwara district.
 On 9 October, one Jaish-e-Mohammed militant was killed by Special Operations Group in Ladoora, Baramulla district and another Jaish-e-Mohammed militant was killed in Gatipora, Shopian district.
 Two militants of unknown affiliation and two Garud commandos were killed in Hajin, Bandipora district on 10 October.
 On 13 October, two Lashkar-e-Taiba militants, including a commander, were killed in Litter, Pulwama district and one Hizbul Mujahideen militant was arrested in Tral, Pulwama district.
 One police driver, Khurshid Ahmad, was killed and another constable injured on 14 October during a militant attack in Damhal Hanjipora, Kulgam district.
 On 16 October, a former sarpanch, Ramzan Sheikh, was killed by three militants in Imam Sahib, Shopian district.
 A police officer was killed by militants in Tral, Pulwama district.
 On 21 October, a militant was killed in Langate, Kupwara district.
 Two militants and one SOG personnel were killed on 28 October in Hajin, Bandipora district.

November

 Five CRPF personnel of the 96th battalion were injured when militants opened fired on their vehicle on 1 November in Anantnag district.
 On 2 November, a Hizbul Mujahideen militant and two Indian Army soldiers were killed while one CRPF personnel was injured Samboora, Pulwama district.
 On 3 November, an infiltration bid along the LOC was foiled and a militant was killed in Kupwara district.
 One Hizbul Mujahideen militant and one Indian army soldier were killed on 14 November in Qazigund, Kulgam district.
 On 18 November, six Lashkar-e-Taiba militants and a Garud commando were killed in Hajin, Bandipora district. This included Zargam Bhai and Mehmood Bhai, Lashkar-e-Taiba commanders, and Owaid, nephew of Zakiur Rehman Lakhvi.
 On 20 November, three Lashkar-e-Taiba militants were killed in Magam, Budgam district. Another militant was killed in forest area of Tral, Pulwama district.
 On 22 November, one militant and one Indian army soldier were killed during an infiltration bid along the LOC.
 On 24 November, one Lashkar-e-Taiba militant was arrested from forest area of Kupwara district.
 On 30 November, four Jaish-e-Mohammed militants were killed in Pakherpora, Budgam district and a Lashkar-e-Taiba militant was killed in Sopore, Baramulla district. One security force personnel was also injured.

December

 On 4 December, three Lashkar-e-Taiba militants involved in the 2017 Amarnath Yatra attack were killed in Anantnag district. One militant who fled from the site was arrested.
 On 10 December, three Lashkar-e-Taiba militants were killed in Unisoo village of Handwara, Kupwara district.
 Two militants, including Tanveer Bhat, were killed on 18 December in Shopian district.
 A Jaish-e-Mohammed militant, Noor Mohammad Tantray, was killed on 25 December in Pulwama district.
 Three Jaish-e-Mohammed militants and five CRPF personnel were killed in an attack on the group training center of 185th battalion in Lethpora, Pulwama district.

2018 
, a total of 222 militants and 41 security personnel have been killed in operations. A unilateral ceasefire was declared by the Indian Government from 14 May to 17 June where the security forces were asked not to launch new operations during Ramadan.

2020 
Indian security forces, between January and 19 June, launched several operations in which 102 terrorists were killed. Lt Gen BS Raju mentioned in a press conference that normalcy will return in the valley within few months and all the terrorists will be eliminated. In the first week of April, Operation Randori Behak (1 April to 5 April) resulted in the deaths of five para commandos from 4 Para, the same commandos which had taken part in the 2016 'surgical strikes'. Among those para commandos was Junior Commissioned Officer Sanjiv Kumar, KC, who died in action on 5 April.

Operation Randori Behak resulted in the most deaths in 202: five terrorists and five soldiers.
On 2 May, following Pakistani border firing and the deaths of Indian security forces, the United Nations spokesperson said that "Antonio Guterres' ceasefire appeal is global".

May onwards, Indian troops have been part of the 2020 China–India skirmishes.

See also
Timeline of Kashmir Conflict
Insurgency in Kashmir
2016 Uri attack
India–Pakistan border skirmishes (2014–2015)
India–Pakistan military confrontation (2016–present)
Indian Armed Forces and the Jammu and Kashmir floods, 2014

Notes

References 
https://viewstoday.in/police-along-with-army-on-friday-have-recovered-arms-and-ammunition-besides-10-packets-of-herione-along-loc-in-kamalkote-uri-area-of-north-kashmirs-baramulla-district-officials-said/

Further reading

 Lt. Gen S K Sinha (1977). Operation Rescue: Military Operations in Jammu and Kashmir 1947-49. Vision Books 
 S N Prasad; Dharm Pal; History Division, Ministry of Defence (1987). History of Operations in Jammu & Kashmir, 1947-48. Government of India. Natraj Publishers. 

Jammu and Kashmir
Indian military-related lists
India–Pakistan border
Indo-Pakistani wars
History of Azad Kashmir
Kashmir conflict
Jammu and Kashmir